Helmen Kütt (born 28 July 1961) is an Estonian Social Democratic Party politician. She was the Minister of Social Protection in Taavi Rõivas´cabinet between 26 March 2014 and 30 March 2015. In the parliament Kütt represents the electoral district of Järva- and Viljandimaa .

Before entering into national politics, Kütt worked as the head of a Social Commity in Viljandi.

Minister of Social Protection 

As Andrus Ansip resigned Taavi Rõivas became the new Prime Minister of Estonia and he formed the coalition with the Social Democratic Party (Andrus Ansip´s III government was a coalition between conservative IRL and classical liberal Reform Party). As a result of coalition negotiations Minister of Social Affairs was torn apart into two separate ministers: Minister of Social Protection and Minister of Health and Labour.

References

1961 births
Living people
Social Democratic Party (Estonia) politicians
People from Viljandi
21st-century Estonian politicians
Members of the Riigikogu, 2011–2015
Members of the Riigikogu, 2015–2019
Members of the Riigikogu, 2023–2027
Women members of the Riigikogu
Tallinn University alumni
21st-century Estonian women politicians